Four Walls Falling was an American hardcore punk band from Richmond, Virginia, active between 1987 and 1995. Their most successful release was Culture Shock in 1991.

Band members

Original lineup

Greta Brinkman (Unseen Force and later Moby, L7,  Debbie Harry Band)
Dewey Rowell (Unseen Force & White Cross, later GWAR)
Bo Steele (Pledge Allegiance)
Taylor Steele on vocals (Pledge Allegiance)
Kyle Walker on drums Fed Up!
Cliff Farrarr replaced Greta on bass
Caine Rose replaced Cliff on bass Fed Up!
Brett Wenleder replaced Dewey on guitar

Later members

Matt Rankin
William Thidemann
John Papazoglou
Grant Ross
Kenny Wagner (died 2016)
John Peters
Jared Srsic
Nick Pell
Stitches
Tommy Anthony

Discography

Albums
Four Walls Falling 7" (1988, Axtion Packed Records)
Culture Shock (1991, Jade Tree Records)
Burn It (1992, Redemption Records)
Punish The Machine 7" (1994, Understand Records)
Food for Worms (LP 1994, Day After Records)

Compilation appearances
Complete Death II (1988)

References

External links
Four Walls Falling Official MySpace Page

Hardcore punk groups from Virginia
Jade Tree (record label) artists